Plaza Apartments, also known as Vernon House, is a historic apartment complex located in the Strawberry Mansion neighborhood of Philadelphia, Pennsylvania.  It was built in 1909, and consists of three four-story, brick and stone buildings in the Colonial Revival style.  The complex is arranged in a "U"-shape, with two narrow courtyards.  The primary facade features two three-story wooden porches, with Corinthian order columns and balconies on top.

It was added to the National Register of Historic Places in 2005.

References

Residential buildings on the National Register of Historic Places in Philadelphia
Colonial Revival architecture in Pennsylvania
Residential buildings completed in 1909
Strawberry Mansion, Philadelphia